Seshutes Airport  or Seshote Airport is an airport serving the village of Seshote in Leribe District, Lesotho.

High terrain off both runway ends may require an angling approach.

See also
Transport in Lesotho
List of airports in Lesotho

References

External links
 OurAirports - Seshutes
 Seshutes Airport
OpenStreetMap - Seshutes
 Google Earth

Airports in Lesotho